Vik Lalić (born 9 February 1976) is a retired Croatian football player who played as a defender. He is currently a coach of NK Croatia Zmijavci.

Club career
He started his career at Hajduk Split in 1996 before moving to Rot-Weiß Oberhausen in Germany in 2001. The following season he returned to Hajduk, transferring to NK Solin in 2005 before finally moving to Neuchâtel Xamax in 2006. He was champion of the Croatian First League with Hajduk in 2001, 2004 and 2005.

References

1976 births
Living people
Sportspeople from Makarska
Association football defenders
Croatian footballers
HNK Hajduk Split players
NK Zadar players
Rot-Weiß Oberhausen players
NK Solin players
Neuchâtel Xamax FCS players
NK Dugopolje players
NK Mosor players
Croatian Football League players
2. Bundesliga players
Swiss Super League players
Croatian expatriate footballers
Expatriate footballers in Germany
Croatian expatriate sportspeople in Germany
Expatriate footballers in Switzerland
Croatian expatriate sportspeople in Switzerland
HNK Hajduk Split non-playing staff